This is a list of colleges and universities in the United States (and one school in Canada) which sponsored a men's lacrosse team that belonged to the Men's Collegiate Lacrosse Association in 2015.  Per MCLA rules, a University or College with fielding an NCAA Division I FBS football team must play at the Division I level.   Any other school plays at the MCLA Division II level, but may petition to "play up" at the Division I level.  Likewise, teams designated as Division I may petition to "play down" at the Division II level, if they are deemed a "developing" team, and are ineligible for post season play.

2019 changes
Before the 2019 MCLA season, there were many changes to conferences. The Central Collegiate Lacrosse Association and the Pioneer Collegiate Lacrosse League agreed to merge into the Continental Lacrosse Conference, while the Great Rivers Lacrosse Conference merged with the Upper Midwest Lacrosse Conference and Lone Star Alliance.

2020 changes
Following the shortened 2020 season several SELC mid-Atlantic teams left to create the newest conference in the MCLA, the Atlantic Lacrosse Conference.

Central Collegiate Lacrosse Association
The Central Collegiate Lacrosse Association merged with the Pioneer Collegiate Lacrosse League before the 2019 season.

Continental Lacrosse Conference

Division 1
Boston College; Chestnut Hill, Massachusetts
University at Buffalo (SUNY-Buffalo); Buffalo, New York
Central Michigan University; Mount Pleasant, Michigan
University of Connecticut; Storrs, Connecticut
Michigan State University; East Lansing, Michigan
University of New Hampshire; Durham, New Hampshire
Northeastern University; Boston, Massachusetts
Temple University; Philadelphia, Pennsylvania
University of Pittsburgh; Pittsburgh, Pennsylvania
Western Michigan University; Kalamazoo, Michigan

Division 2
Bridgeport University; Bridgeport, Connecticut
Bridgewater State University; Bridgewater, Massachusetts
Central Connecticut State University; New Britain, Connecticut
Framingham State University; Framingham, Massachusetts
University of New Haven; West Haven, Connecticut
University of Rhode Island; Kingston, Rhode Island
Southern Connecticut State University; New Haven, Connecticut
Stonehill College; Easton, Massachusetts
Westfield State University; Westfield, Massachusetts
Worcester Polytechnic Institute; Worcester, Massachusetts
Worcester State University; Worcester, Massachusetts

Great Rivers Lacrosse Conference
The Great Rivers Lacrosse Conference merged with the Upper Midwest Lacrosse Conference and Lone Star Alliance before the 2019 season.

Lone Star Alliance

Division 1
Arkansas: Fayetteville, Arkansas
Houston: Houston, Texas
Louisiana State University: Baton Rouge, Louisiana
North Texas: Denton, Texas
Oklahoma: Norman, Oklahoma
Southern Methodist University: Dallas, Texas
Texas: Austin, Texas
Texas A&M University: College Station, Texas
Texas Christian University: Fort Worth, Texas
Texas State University: San Marcos, Texas
Texas Tech University: Lubbock, Texas

Division 2
Abilene Christian: Abilene, Texas
Baylor: Waco, Texas
Centenary College of Louisiana: Shreveport, Louisiana
Creighton University: Omaha, Nebraska
Dallas Baptist: Dallas, Texas
Hardin-Simmons: Abilene, Texas
Incarnate Word: San Antonio, Texas
Kansas State University: Manhattan, Kansas
Louisiana-Lafayette: Lafayette, Louisiana
Louisiana Tech: Ruston, Louisiana
Missouri University of Science and Technology: Rolla, Missouri
Missouri State University: Springfield, Missouri
Oklahoma State: Stillwater, Oklahoma
Rice: Houston, Texas
St. Edward's: Austin, Texas
Saint Louis University: St. Louis, Missouri
Southeastern Louisiana: Hammond, Louisiana
Texas–San Antonio: San Antonio, Texas
Tarleton State: Stephenville, Texas
TAMU-Corpus Christi: Corpus Christi, Texas
TAMU-Galveston: Galveston, Texas
Trinity: San Antonio, Texas
Tulane University: New Orleans, Louisiana 
Washington University in St. Louis: St. Louis, Missouri

Pioneer Collegiate Lacrosse League
The Pioneer Collegiate Lacrosse League merged with the Central Collegiate Lacrosse Association to form the Continental Lacrosse Conference.

Pacific Northwest Collegiate Lacrosse League

Division 1
Boise State University; Boise, Idaho
University of Idaho; Moscow, Idaho
University of Oregon; Eugene, Oregon
Oregon State University; Corvallis, Oregon
Simon Fraser University; Burnaby, British Columbia
University of Washington; Seattle, Washington

Division 2
Central Washington University; Ellensburg, Washington
Gonzaga University; Spokane, Washington
College of Idaho; Caldwell, Idaho
University of Montana; Missoula, Montana
Pacific Lutheran University; Tacoma, Washington
University of Portland; Portland, Oregon
Portland State University; Portland, Oregon
University of Providence; Great Falls, Montana
Seattle University; Seattle, Washington
Southern Oregon University; Ashland, Oregon
Western Oregon University; Monmouth, Oregon
Western Washington University; Bellingham, Washington

Rocky Mountain Lacrosse Conference

Division 1
Brigham Young University; Provo, Utah
University of Colorado; Boulder, Colorado
Colorado State University; Fort Collins, Colorado
Utah Valley University; Orem, Utah

Division 2
University of Colorado Denver; Denver, Colorado
Colorado State University - Pueblo; Pueblo, Colorado
Colorado School of Mines; Golden, Colorado
Fort Lewis College; Durango, Colorado
Metropolitan State University of Denver; Denver, Colorado
Montana State University; Bozeman, Montana
University of Northern Colorado; Greeley, Colorado
Utah State University; Logan, Utah
University of Wyoming; Laramie, Wyoming

SouthEastern Lacrosse Conference
Several teams in the Mid-Atlantic Region separated from the Southeastern Lacrosse Conference in 2020 to create the Atlantic Lacrosse Conference, along with Mississippi schools leaving to join the Lonestar Alliance Conference.

Division 1
University of Alabama; Tuscaloosa, Alabama
Auburn University; Auburn, Alabama
University of Central Florida; Orlando, Florida
Clemson University; Clemson, South Carolina
East Carolina University; Greenville, North Carolina
University of Florida; Gainesville, Florida
Florida State University; Tallahassee, Florida
University of Georgia; Athens, Georgia
Georgia Tech; Atlanta, Georgia
University of South Carolina; Columbia, South Carolina
University of South Florida; Tampa, Florida
University of Tennessee; Knoxville, Tennessee
Vanderbilt University; Nashville, Tennessee

Division 2
Appalachian State University; Boone, North Carolina
College of Charleston; Charleston, South Carolina
Coastal Carolina University; Conway, South Carolina
Davidson College; Davidson, North Carolina
Elon University; Elon, North Carolina
Florida Atlantic University; Boca Raton, Florida
Florida Gulf Coast University; Fort Myers, Florida
Georgia Southern University; Statesboro, Georgia
Kennesaw State University; Kennesaw, Georgia
University of Miami; Coral Gables, Florida
University of North Carolina–Charlotte; Charlotte, North Carolina
University of North Carolina–Wilmington; Wilmington, North Carolina
University of North Florida; Jacksonville, Florida
Wake Forest University; Winston-Salem, North Carolina

Southwestern Lacrosse Conference

Division 1
University of Arizona; Tucson, Arizona
Arizona State University; Tempe, Arizona
University of California, Los Angeles; Los Angeles, California
Chapman University; Orange, California
Claremont Colleges; Claremont, California
Concordia University–Irvine; Irvine, California
Grand Canyon University; Phoenix, Arizona
University of Nevada–Las Vegas; Las Vegas, Nevada
San Diego State University; San Diego, California
University of Southern California; Los Angeles, California

Division 2
Biola University; La Mirada, California
California State University–Channel Islands; Camarillo, California
California State University–Fullerton; Fullerton, California
California State University–Long Beach; Long Beach, California
California State University–San Marcos; San Marcos, California
University of California–Irvine; Irvine, California
University of California–San Diego; San Diego, California
Loyola Marymount University; Los Angeles, California
Marymount California University; Rancho Palos Verdes, California
Northern Arizona University; Flagstaff, Arizona
Occidental College; Los Angeles, California
University of San Diego; San Diego, California

Upper Midwest Lacrosse Conference

Division 1
University of Illinois; Urbana, Illinois
Illinois State University; Normal, Illinois
Indiana University; Bloomington, Indiana
Iowa State University; Ames, Iowa
University of Kansas; Lawrence, Kansas
University of Minnesota; Minneapolis, Minnesota
University of Missouri; Columbia, Missouri
University of Nebraska–Lincoln; Lincoln, Nebraska
Oakland University; Auburn Hills, Michigan
Purdue University; West Lafayette, Indiana

Division 2
University of Dayton; Dayton, Ohio
Grand Valley State University; Allendale, Michigan
University of Minnesota–Duluth; Duluth, Minnesota
North Dakota State University; Fargo, North Dakota
Saint John's University; Collegeville, Minnesota
University of St. Thomas; St. Paul, Minnesota

Western Collegiate Lacrosse League

Division 1
University of California; Berkeley, California
University of California, Santa Barbara; Santa Barbara, California
California Polytechnic State University; San Luis Obispo, California
California State University, Chico; Chico, California
Dominican University of California, San Rafael, California
University of Nevada; Reno, Nevada
Santa Clara University; Santa Clara, California
Sierra Nevada College; Incline Village, Nevada
Sonoma State University; Rohnert Park, California
Stanford University; Stanford, California

Division 2
University of California–Santa Cruz; Santa Cruz, California
Humboldt State University; Arcata, California
Saint Mary's College; Moraga, California
San Jose State University; San Jose, California
University of California–Davis; Davis, California